Nikola Biller-Andorno is a German bioethicist. She is Professor and Director of the Institute of Biomedical Ethics of the University of Zurich, Switzerland.

Biller-Andorno studied medicine at the University of Erlangen-Nuremberg (State Medical Exam 1996, Dr. med. 1997) as well as philosophy and social sciences at the University of Hagen, Germany (M.A. 1996, Dr. phil. 2001). Multiple scholarships and awards allowed her to pursue her research interests at prestigious institutions such as the Hastings Center (1994), Yale University (1997) and the Harvard Medical School (1997–98).
After completing her habilitation thesis in ethics and theory of medicine at the University of Göttingen, Germany, she worked as Ethicist at the World Health Organization (2002-2004).

In 2004 she was appointed professor of medical ethics at the Charité, Joint Medical Faculty of the Free and Humboldt University, Berlin, Germany. In October 2005 she joined the University of Zurich as Full Professor of Biomedical Ethics. Since 2007 she is director of the Institute of Biomedical Ethics of the same university, which was designated as WHO Collaborating Center for Bioethics in 2009. She is a board member of the Swiss Society of Biomedical Ethics as well as of the German Academy of Ethics in Medicine and was elected President of the International Association of Bioethics in 2009. She serves as a member of the Central Ethics Committee of the Swiss Academy of Medical Sciences, of the Ethics Committee of the University of Zurich, and as deputy editor of the Journal of Medical Ethics.

External links
 http://www.ibme.uzh.ch/de/ethik/team/direktion/biller-andorno.html

Bioethicists
Academic staff of the University of Zurich
University of Erlangen-Nuremberg alumni
Yale University alumni
Harvard Medical School alumni
University of Göttingen alumni
Living people
Year of birth missing (living people)